The sixth Silver City Trophy was a motor race, run to Formula One rules, held on 3 June 1961 at Brands Hatch Circuit. The race was run over 76 laps of the circuit, and was won by British driver Stirling Moss  in a Lotus 18/21.

The race was overshadowed by a fatal accident during qualifying when Shane Summers crashed his Cooper T53 into the concrete entrance to the paddock road tunnel.

Results

Stirling Moss was entered by the Rob Walker Racing Team to drive a Cooper-Climax but he did not race this car.

References
 "The Grand Prix Who's Who", Steve Small, 1995.
 "The Formula One Record Book", John Thompson, 1974.

Silver City Trophy
Silver City Trophy